WFNZ may refer to:

 WFNZ (AM), a radio station (610 AM) licensed to Charlotte, North Carolina, United States
 WFNZ-FM, a radio station (92.7 FM) licensed to Harrisburg, North Carolina, United States